Robert Andrew Dustal (September 28, 1935 – November 30, 2015) was an American professional baseball player. A ,  right-handed pitcher whose professional career lasted for 14 seasons (1955–1968), Dustal appeared in seven Major League games as a relief pitcher for the  Detroit Tigers. In his only decision, on April 20, 1963, at Fenway Park, he suffered an excruciating loss when he allowed a game-winning, two-run double to Román Mejías in the bottom of the 15th inning to give the Boston Red Sox a come-from-behind, 4–3 victory over his Tigers.

Dustal allowed nine runs, six of them earned, over six innings of relief, giving up ten hits and five bases on balls. He won 116 games over the course of his minor league career, most of it played in the Tiger organization. He also managed in the Detroit farm system in the late 1960s.

References

External links
Career record and playing statistics from Baseball Reference

1935 births
2015 deaths
Augusta Tigers players
Baseball players from New Jersey
Birmingham Barons players
Denver Bears players
Detroit Tigers players
Durham Bulls players
Fulton Lookouts players
Idaho Falls Russets players
Jamestown Falcons players
Jersey City Jerseys players
Knoxville Smokies players
Major League Baseball pitchers
Minor league baseball managers
Montgomery Rebels players
People from Sayreville, New Jersey
Sportspeople from Middlesex County, New Jersey
Syracuse Chiefs players
Valdosta Tigers players